The 1952–53 Western Kentucky State Hilltoppers men's basketball team represented Western Kentucky State College (now known as Western Kentucky University) during the 1952-53 NCAA University Division Basketball season. The Hilltoppers were led by future Naismith Memorial Basketball Hall of Fame coach Edgar Diddle and All-American player Tom Marshall.  The Hilltoppers won the Ohio Valley Conference tournament and were invited to the 1953 National Invitation Tournament.   During this period, the NIT was considered on par with the NCAA tournament.  Art Spoelstra joined Marshall on the All-Conference  and OVC Tournament teams.

Schedule

|-
!colspan=6| Regular Season

|-

|-
!colspan=6| 1953 Ohio Valley Conference Tournament

|-
!colspan=6| 1953 National Invitation Tournament

References

Western Kentucky Hilltoppers basketball seasons
Western Kentucky State
Western Kentucky State
Western Kentucky State Basketball, Men's
Western Kentucky State Basketball, Men's